Sabra taibaishanensis is a moth in the family Drepanidae. It was described by Chou and Xiang in 1987. It is found in China.

References

Moths described in 1987
Drepaninae
Moths of Asia